Karl W. Boyes (March 1, 1936 – May 11, 2003) was a Republican member of the Pennsylvania House of Representatives.

Biography
He was a 1959 graduate of Edinboro State College and attended classes at Allegheny College and Union College. He was first elected to represent the 3rd legislative district in the Pennsylvania House of Representatives in 1980, a position he held until his death on May 11, 2003.

He was also a Millcreek Township Supervisor from 1966 until his being elected to the Pennsylvania House in 1980.

The Karl Boyes Multipurpose Trail is a 13.5-mile bike loop through Presque Isle State Park, Erie, Pennsylvania.

The $100,000 Karl Boyes Northwestern Pa. Memorial Stakes race at Presque Isle Downs is held each year in honor of the former house of representative.

References

External links
 official PA House profile (archived)

2003 deaths
Republican Party members of the Pennsylvania House of Representatives
1936 births
20th-century American politicians